Andrew Miller (born 27 February 1899) was a Scottish footballer who played for Celtic, Dumbarton, Nottingham Forest and Bo'ness.

References

1899 births
Scottish footballers
Dumbarton F.C. players
Celtic F.C. players
Nottingham Forest F.C. players
Bo'ness F.C. players
Camelon Juniors F.C. players
Stenhousemuir F.C. players
Scottish Football League players
English Football League players
Year of death missing
Association football forwards